Emeritus Professor Rustem Devletovich Zhantiev Dn (born 11 October 1937, Yalta) is a Russian scientist, specialising in the fields of the systematics, ecology and physiology of insect acoustic communication, orientation, and neurophysiology.

Biography
In 1960 he graduated from Department of Entomology in the Biological Faculty of Moscow State University. From 1960 to 1963 he worked in the Post-graduate Department of Entomology and from 1963 to the present he has worked at Moscow State University. In 1966 he wrote his thesis  The taxonomic and ecological analysis of Sem. Dermestidae (Coleoptera)  and in 1980 his PhD on insect bioacoustics.

In 1982 he became a professor, giving lectures and seminars on insect physiology, Coleoptera, the Principles of Zoological Systematics and the modern problems and methods of entomology. He became a laureate of the USSR State Prize in 1987, the same year as he was given the Medal "Veteran of Labour". Since 1990 he has been the head  of the Department of Entomology in the Faculty of Biology at Moscow State University, where he became an Emeritus Professor in 1998. In 1997 he was given the Medal "In Commemoration of the 850th Anniversary of Moscow" and in 2002 he was made an Honoured Worker of the Higher Schools of the Russian Federation.

Awards 
 USSR State Prize (1987)
 Medal "Veteran of Labour" (1987)
 Medal "In Commemoration of the 850th Anniversary of Moscow" (1997)

Major works
He has written over 100 works, including:

Books
  Жуки-кожееды (семейство Dermestidae) фауны СССР.  Kozheedy Beetles (family Dermestidae) fauna of the USSR.  Издательство Московского университета, 1976. Moscow University Publishing House, 1976.
  Биоакустика насекомых. Bioacoustics insects. Издательство Московского университета, 1981. Moscow University Publishing House, 1981.
  2005. Кафедра энтомологии Московского государственного университета. М.: Т-во научных изданий КМК. Zhantiev RD, Gull S., Ryazanov, GI, Farafonova GV Ahaev DN, Benediktov AA, 2005 . Department of Entomology, Moscow State University. MM: Association of KMK Scientific Press. 137 с. 137.

Articles
   2001. Личинки жуков-кожеедов рода Dermestes (Coleoptera, Dermestidae) России и сопредельных стран. Zhantiev RD, 2001. The larvae of beetles, carpet beetle genus Dermestes (Coleoptera, Dermestidae) of Russia and neighboring countries. Подрод Montandonia // Зоол. Subgenus Montandonia / / Zool. журн. Journ. Т. 80. T. 80. № 3. № 3. С. 371-375. S. 371-375.
   2001. Жуки-кожееды рода Orphilus Er. Zhantiev RD, 2001. Beetles kozheedy kind Orphilus Er. (Coleoptera, Dermestidae) фауны Палеарктик и // Энтомол. (Coleoptera, Dermestidae) and Palaearctic / / Entomol. обоз. carts. Т. 80. T. 80. № 3. № 3. С. 611-619. S. 611-619.
  2002. Новые и малоизученные кожееды (Coleoptera, Dermestidae) из Закавказья // Зоол. Zhantiev RD, 2002. New and lesser known kozheedy (Coleoptera, Dermestidae) from the Caucasus, Zool. журн. Journ. Т. 81. T. 81. № 3. № 3. С. 369-372. S. 369-372.
 2007. Спонтанная активность интернейронов кузнечиков (Orthoptera, Tettigoniidue) при разной температуре // Проблемы и перспективы общей энтомологии. Zhantiev RD, Chukanov VS Korsunovskaya OS, 2007. Spontaneous activity of interneurons of grasshoppers (Orthoptera, Tettigoniidue) at different temperatures: Problems and prospects of general entomology. Тезисы докладов XIII съезда РЭО, Краснодар, 9-15 сентября 2007 г. С. 112-113. Abstracts XIII Congress of the RER, Krasnodar, 9–15 September 2007 S. 112-113.
  2007. Реакции на звук слуховых рецепторов кузнечиков (Orthoptera, Tettigoniidae) при разной температуре // Проблемы и перспективы общей энтомологии. Korsunovskaya OS, Zhantiev RD, 2007. Reactions to the sound of auditory receptors of grasshoppers (Orthoptera, Tettigoniidae) at different temperatures: Problems and prospects of general entomology. Тезисы докладов XIII съезда РЭО, Краснодар, 9-15 сентября 2007 г. С. 166. Abstracts XIII Congress of the RER, Krasnodar, 9–15 September 2007 S. 166.

References

External links
 Zoological Institute of the Russian Institute of Sciences - biography

Russian entomologists
People from Yalta
Living people
1937 births
Soviet entomologists
Recipients of the USSR State Prize
Academic staff of Moscow State University
Moscow State University alumni